Ben or Benjamin Clark may refer to:

 Ben Clark (footballer, born 1983), English footballer
 Ben Clark (mountaineer) (born 1979), American mountaineer
 Ben Clark (politician), American politician in North Carolina
 Ben Clark, musician in The Lashes
 Ben Clark, member of comedy sketch group Pappy's
 Benjamin Preston Clark (1860–1939), American entomologist
 Benjamin S. W. Clark (1829–1912), American merchant and politician from New York
 Bob Clark (Benjamin Clark, 1939–2007), American actor, director, screenwriter and producer

See also
 Ben Clarke (disambiguation)